On 6 March 1921, the Curfew Murders took place in Limerick, Ireland. They took the lives of George Clancy, Michael O'Callaghan and Volunteer Joseph O’Donoghue.

References

1920s murders in Ireland
Irish War of Independence
History of Limerick (city)